Ajit Singh (died September 4, 2004) was an Indian politician with criminal background from the Samajwadi Party. Formerly, he was affiliated with the Bharatiya Janata Party. He served as a Member of the Uttar Pradesh Legislative Council twice.

Ajit Singh came into the limelight in the late 1990s when the Uttar Pradesh state Criminal Investigation Department charged him for his alleged involvement in the murder of a leading real estate businessman, Rajesh Aggarwal, in Lucknow. His Wife Is Zila Panchayat Adhyaksh From Unnao And His Son Shashank Shekhar Singh Is An Active Politician From Bhartiya Janta Party

He was inducted into the Bharatiya Janata Party by Rajnath Singh.

Death 
He was shot dead on September 4, 2004, by five men allegedly led by MLA Akhilesh Kumar Singh at a hotel in Unnao, where Ajit Singh was celebrating his birthday. A First information report (FIR) was registered against Akhilesh Singh, who was then close to the Samajwadi Party, Ramesh Kalia, a Bharatiya Janata Party leader, and three others. Akhilesh was made prime accused in the Ajit Singh murder case, but his role was not established.

References 

2004 deaths
Bharatiya Janata Party politicians from Uttar Pradesh
Members of the Uttar Pradesh Legislative Council
21st-century Indian politicians
People from Uttar Pradesh
Samajwadi Party politicians
Assassinated Indian politicians
People murdered in Uttar Pradesh